Hellinger's Law is a 1981 TV movie starring Telly Savalas, and  directed by Leo Penn. It was the pilot for a proposed TV series starring Savalas which was not made, and was screened as a stand-alone film.

Cast
Telly Savalas as Nick Hellinger
Morgan Stevens as Andy Clay
Ja'Net DuBois as Dottie Singer
Roy Poole as Judge Carroll
Rod Taylor as Clint Tolliver
Melinda Dillon as Anne Gronouski
James Sutorius as Lon Braden
Tom McFadden as Detective Roy Donovan
Lisa Blake Richards as Cara Braden
Kyle Richards as Julie Braden
Arlen Dean Snyder as Da Fred Whedon
Thom Christopher as Bill Rossetti

Production
Filming was to have begun on 27 February 1980 but was pushed back, reportedly to iron out script problems. Several days of filming took place at the Crutcher Ranch in Fulshear, Texas in April of that year. Fulshear is located about 40 miles west of Houston. About a hundred local residents were used as extras for several of the outdoor scenes.

"I know some people are thinking it's a pilot," said Savalas at the time. "I didn't think that way. I made a two-hour movie. But doing it as a series would be different. Kojak was easy because I was playing Telly for the most part. It was a role I could ad lib. Although I could play a credible lawyer, I know nothing about the law. I'd be more dependent on the scriptwriters." Savalas said if the series went ahead he would want to make the character come from New York rather than Philadelphia. "Telly's from New York, and if you do a series you want to make it comfortable for the actor. It'd have to be close to my roots so I wouldn't have to worry about my speech pattern."

Novelization
In December 1980, approximately three months before the telefilm aired, Jove Books released a novelization of the teleplay. The legal-sounding by-line is by author "Justin Barr", which is probably a pseudonym as it appears on no other published work, and novelization commissions tend to go to writers with prior book credits. The cover features a still of Savalas and a price of $2.25.

References

External links

Hellinger's Law at TCMDB
Review of film at New York Times
Hellinger's Law at Rod Taylor Site
Hellinger's Law at BFI

1981 television films
1981 films
American crime drama films
1981 crime drama films
American drama television films
1980s English-language films
Films directed by Leo Penn
1980s American films